Willerby and Kirk Ella railway station was a station on the Hull and Barnsley Railway, and served the villages of Willerby and Kirk Ella in the East Riding of Yorkshire, England.

The station opened on 27 July 1885. It was located west of the junction of Carr Lane and Main Street, partly on an embankment. The station building was designed in the English domestic revival style. The goods yard with a loop and two sidings served a cattle dock, pens and a coal yard. Kirk Ella limeworks had a private siding branching off the line between Little Weighton and Willerby. The station closed to passengers on 1 August 1955 and to freight on 6 July 1964. It was subsequently demolished and the area redeveloped for housing purposes. A road was built over the track alignment northwest of the station, and a car park southeast of it.

References

External links
 Willerby and Kirk Ella station on navigable 1947 O. S. map

Disused railway stations in the East Riding of Yorkshire
Railway stations in Great Britain opened in 1885
Railway stations in Great Britain closed in 1955
Former Hull and Barnsley Railway stations